The 1914 Maryland Aggies football team represented Maryland Agricultural College (which became Maryland State College in 1916 and part of the University of Maryland in 1920) in the 1914 college football season. In their fourth season under head coach Curley Byrd, the Aggies compiled a 5–3 record and outscored all opponents, 72 to 49. The team's three losses were to Baltimore Polytechnic Institute (0–6), McDaniel College (13–20), and Gallaudet University (0–23).

Schedule

References

Maryland
Maryland Terrapins football seasons
Maryland Aggies football